Euronova TV is a television station in Moldova. Its headquarters are in Ungheni.

It provides news of public interest from a number of areas. Euronova TV is a member of Euronova Media Group Holding, which includes Albasat TV and the radio station Vocea Basarabiei.

References

External links 
 MASS MEDIA PERSPECTIVE 
 Appeal: Radio Station "Vocea Basarabiei" (Voice of Basarabia) and Television "Euronova Basarabia -1" of the holding Euronova Media Group.

Television in Moldova
Television channels in Moldova
Euronova Media Group
Mass media in Ungheni